Diacodexis is an extinct genus of small herbivore mammals belonging to the family Dichobunidae which lived in North America, Europe and Pakistan from 55.4 mya to 46.2 mya and existing for approximately .

Description
 
Diacodexis is the oldest known even-toed ungulate. Unlike most later species of artiodactyl, it still had five toes on each foot, although the third and fourth toes were already elongated. It may also have had small hooves on each toe. Its teeth suggest that it was a herbivorous browser.

As suggested by its long legs, Diacodexis is believed to have been fast-running, capable of leaping relatively far.

Morphology
Specimen 1: 
Specimen 2: 
Specimen 3: 
Specimen 4:

Fossil distribution
Diacodexis was widespread, with fossils having been found in Pakistan, Europe, and North America.

References

Bibliography 

 
 

Dichobunids
Eocene even-toed ungulates
Ypresian life
Lutetian life
Wasatchian
Bridgerian
Eocene mammals of Asia
Paleogene India
Fossils of India
Fossils of Kyrgyzstan
Fossils of Pakistan
Eocene mammals of Europe
Paleogene Belgium
Fossils of Belgium
Paleogene England
Fossils of England
Paleogene France
Fossils of France
Paleogene Portugal
Fossils of Portugal
Paleogene Spain
Fossils of Spain
Eocene mammals of North America
Fossils of the United States
Paleontology in Colorado
Paleontology in Mississippi
Paleontology in New Mexico
Paleontology in North Dakota
Paleontology in Wyoming
Fossil taxa described in 1882
Taxa named by Edward Drinker Cope
Prehistoric even-toed ungulate genera